Aleksei Viktorovich Shlyapkin (born 17 August 1987) is a Russian former professional football player.

Club career
He made his Russian Football National League debut for FC Baltika Kaliningrad on 28 March 2009 in a game against FC Chernomorets Novorossiysk.

External links
 

1987 births
People from Almetyevsk
Living people
Russian footballers
FC Baltika Kaliningrad players
FC KAMAZ Naberezhnye Chelny players
FC Orenburg players
FC Tyumen players
Association football midfielders
FC Volga Ulyanovsk players
Sportspeople from Tatarstan